Gréoux-les-Bains (Provençal Occitan: Greù) is a commune in the Alpes-de-Haute-Provence department in the Provence-Alpes-Côte d'Azur region in Southeastern France. Best known for its Château des Templiers, the town is on the right bank of the river Verdon. The commune, on the departmental border with Var, had a population of 2,639 in 2019.

Demographics

See also
 Coteaux de Pierrevert AOC
Communes of the Alpes-de-Haute-Provence department

References

Communes of Alpes-de-Haute-Provence
Alpes-de-Haute-Provence communes articles needing translation from French Wikipedia